The Chrysler Airflow is a concept mid-size crossover SUV developed by Chrysler.

Launch and development 

The Chrysler Airflow Vision Concept was announced by the FCA USA at CES 2020 ahead of its official presentation two years later at CES 2022. A production-ready concept made its debut at the 2022 New York International Auto Show.

The Airflow is named after the original Chrysler Airflow, the first car whose design took into account the importance of aerodynamics. The goal is to show an evolution of the automobile as did its ancestor.

Specifications 
The Airflow is equipped with an electric motor and a futuristic design. Shaped like a compact SUV, the lines are fluid but muscular. The wheels are wrapped in their arches, and the grille features an illuminated Chrysler winged logo. Inside, all of the equipment is digital with the exception of the start button and the steering wheel navigation keys. The screen interface is customizable, each passenger having access to vehicle information in real time.  The vehicle control system will be one of the first to leverage the STLA Brain software architecture, an AI driven driver assist and experience ecosystem for Stellantis vehicles.

References 

Airflow
Mid-size sport utility vehicles
Crossover sport utility vehicles
Electric concept cars
All-wheel-drive vehicles
Upcoming car models